Elizabeth Ann Sheridan (April 10, 1929 – April 15, 2022) was an American actress. While best known for her roles as Jerry's mother, Helen, in Seinfeld and the nosy neighbor, Mrs. Ochmonek, on sitcom ALF, her decades-long career was extensive and included work on the stage and on large and small screens.

Early life 
Sheridan was born in Rye, New York, on April 10, 1929. Her father, Frank Sheridan, was a classical pianist; her mother, Elizabeth Poole-Jones, was a concert singer. She was raised by her mother in Westchester County, New York, after her parents' separation. As a child, she was given the nickname "Dizzy", a shortened version of "Dizabeth", which is how her sister managed to pronounce her name when they were young.

Career 
Sheridan began her professional life as a nightclub dancer and singer in the 1950s, and spent much of her early career living and working in the Caribbean. In the late 1960s, back in New York City, she performed in one of Julius Monk's annual cabaret reviews at Plaza 9, located in the Plaza Hotel. She also appeared in plays and musicals on Broadway, co-starring with Meryl Streep and Christopher Lloyd in the 1977 musical, Happy End, before moving to Los Angeles. Working in Hollywood, she came to prominence in supporting roles in over a dozen feature films and 60 prime time network television movies, mini-series, and series including Kojak, Archie Bunker's Place, St. Elsewhere, Newhart, Moonlighting, The A-Team, Who's the Boss, Hill St. Blues, Cagney & Lacey, Family Ties, Murder, She Wrote, and Double Rush. Her first major role was playing the nosy neighbor Raquel Ochmonek on the NBC TV series ALF, from 1986 to 1990.

Following that she secured her most renowned and long-lived role, as Jerry's "protective, Florida-living mom", Helen, on Seinfeld. She appeared in all nine seasons, from 1990 to 1998, the only actor to do so apart from the four leads, and was last surviving actress to play one of the parents of the Seinfeld main cast members.

In 2009, with Andy Griffith and Doris Roberts, Sheridan co-starred in the feature film Play the Game, a romantic comedy about a widowed grandfather who learns dating tricks from his serial romancer of a grandson. The film received attention for containing a sex scene between Sheridan and Griffith.

Personal life 
While working as a dancer in New York City nightclubs, Sheridan met the then-unknown James Dean. She wrote a book, Dizzy & Jimmy: My Life with James Dean: A Love Story, chronicling their time together in the early 1950s. In it, she describes them as each other's first romantic love. "We had great times... We didn't want to be apart. We found a place and lived together... before he really hit it big." At one point in their relationship, they found themselves traveling to Ohio with Major League Baseball player Clyde McCullough. During the trip, as they discussed baseball, she realized that if she and Dean were married she would be known as "Dizzy Dean", evoking thoughts of the baseball player of the same name.

Dean pursued work on the stage in New York City, with film roles in Hollywood soon to follow. Without sure footing or a serious plan, forging a future was not an option, thus bringing about the end of their relationship. "He was being hauled away into this career, and I couldn't follow him," she said in an interview.

Early in 1953, Sheridan departed New York City for the Virgin Islands. She lived for over a decade in St. Thomas and later Puerto Rico. She earned a living as a dancer and also by singing and playing piano. Together with a neighbor who had a dance troupe, she won a dance contest she choreographed for the first Carnival in St. Thomas. She also earned a $600 purse finishing first in a horse race, atop her stallion, Generalé.

After a brief engagement to Justus Villa (aka Pancho), she realized she didn't want to marry him, broke it off, and returned, for a time, to New York City. There, at a party, she again met Dean. Afterwards, in a cab, he told her, "Nothing's lost between us. It never will be. You're a part of me and I'm a part of you. I take you with me wherever I go." That was the last time she saw him.

Back in the Caribbean, she met jazz musician [William] Dale Wales (1917–2003) in Puerto Rico. They shared a life from 1960 until his death in 2003; they wed in 1985. Their daughter Stephanie is a photographer. Sheridan said, "I'm so unmotherly, I cannot tell you. I'm still a flower child somewhere. My daughter was more my friend than my daughter most of her life."

Sheridan and actress Elizabeth Montgomery were friends, and were respectively known together as Dizzy and Lizzie. Montgomery only took on the nickname "Lizzie" following her performance in the Emmy Award-winning TV movie, The Legend of Lizzie Borden The pair adored horses and together they frequented the Santa Anita race track.

Sheridan died on April 15, 2022, at her home in Manhattan, at the age of 93.

Filmography

Film

Television

References

External links 
 
 
 

1929 births
2022 deaths
20th-century American actresses
21st-century American actresses
Actresses from New York (state)
American female dancers
American dancers
American film actresses
American stage actresses
American television actresses
American musical theatre actresses
American voice actresses
People from Westchester County, New York
Dancers from New York (state)